Darkabad or Darakabad may refer to:
 Darkabad, Chaharmahal and Bakhtiari
 Darakabad, Isfahan